St. Agnes Cathedral School, otherwise known as The St. Agnes School, is a K-8 private co-educational Catholic country day school in Rockville Centre, New York, United States. It was founded in 1917 as St. Agnes Elementary School by Monsignor Peter Quealy.

A major portion of the student body reside in Rockville Centre, and neighboring towns. It is joined by a collection of other schools as part of the Diocese of Rockville Centre school system. St. Agnes Cathedral School is the largest elementary school in the Diocese of Rockville Centre. The school resides on campus along with St. Agnes Cathedral, the base of the Diocese of Rockville Centre.

History 
Founded in 1917 by Monsignor Peter Quealy, St. Agnes Cathedral School was originally named St. Agnes Elementary School. The ten-room school house had a founding faculty made up of five Dominican Sisters. The school’s first principal was Mother Petra, who served as Principal until her death in 1939. The increasing need for Catholic elementary education in Rockville Centre made the school soon outgrow their ten-room building. This led to the purchase of the Clinton Avenue building from the Rockville Centre Public School District in 1957. The North and South Wings of the school were later added during renovations in the 1960s.

Facilities 
The Saint Agnes School is located on the Saint Agnes Complex, which consists of several properties. Saint Agnes' campus includes:
 Recently renovated Science Lab
 Gymnasium
 Melton Auditorium
 3 Performance Spaces
 37 Classroom Spaces
 Lecture Space
 Outdoor Playground, Indoor and Outdoor Play Areas and Fields
 SMARTboards in all classrooms for grades K-8
 Library and Virtual Library Access
 Internet Access in all Buildings and Classrooms
 and not that mean

Secondary school placement 
In recent years, St. Agnes students have scored higher than other local schools on state assessments, receiving average scores no lower than a 97.1. The scores of St. Agnes students to local public districts as well as fellow Diocese of Rockville Centre schools are comparatively higher. Following their graduation from St. Agnes, students in recent years have gone on to attend various secondary  schools on Long Island, including: Chaminade High School, Kellenberg Memorial High School, Sacred Heart Academy, Holy Trinity High School, Friends Academy, Long Island Lutheran. In addition, Saint Agnes has also sent several students in recent years to secondary schools in Manhattan, including: The Marymount School, Convent of the Sacred Heart, Dominican Academy, Regis High School and Xavier High School.

Notable alumni 
 Billy Donovan, 2-time NCAA champion basketball coach, University of Florida
 Joey Heatherton, actress and singer
 Carmen Ortiz, U.S. Attorney for Massachusetts
 Bethenny Frankel, Entrepreneur and Real Housewife of New York City.

In popular culture
The St. Agnes School has appeared in several films that have been filmed in Rockville Centre. Edward Burns has worn a St. Agnes sweatshirt in several of his films.

References

1917 establishments in New York (state)
Educational institutions established in 1917
Catholic elementary schools in New York (state)
Schools in Nassau County, New York